Victoria Stadnik (born 25 November 1979 in Odessa, USSR) is an Individual Rhythmic Gymnast who competed at the 1995 and 1996 World Rhythmic Gymnastics Championships.

References

1979 births
Living people
Ukrainian rhythmic gymnasts
Deriugins Gymnasts
Sportspeople from Odesa
Medalists at the Rhythmic Gymnastics World Championships
20th-century Ukrainian women